It'll End in Tears is the first album released by 4AD collective This Mortal Coil, an umbrella title for a loose grouping of guest musicians and vocalists brought together by label boss Ivo Watts-Russell. The album was released on 1 October 1984, and reached #38 on the UK Albums Chart. It features many of the artists on the 4AD roster at the time, including Cocteau Twins, Colourbox, and Dead Can Dance; as well as key post-punk figure Howard Devoto, who sang "Holocaust", one of two covers of songs from the Third/Sister Lovers album by Big Star. The other Alex Chilton-penned track, album opener "Kangaroo", was released as a single to promote the album. Two key songs were performed by Elizabeth Fraser of Cocteau Twins, including Tim Buckley's "Song to the Siren", which reached #66 on the UK Charts when released as This Mortal Coil's debut single a year before the album. The song remained on the UK Indie Chart for almost two years. Fraser also performed on "Another Day" by Roy Harper. 4AD would go on to release two further albums under the name of This Mortal Coil: Filigree & Shadow (1986) and Blood (1991).

Valentino Records, a sublabel of Atco Records, released the album in the United States in late 1984, the only time a This Mortal Coil album was released simultaneously in the UK and the US. All three This Mortal Coil albums were later re-released in the US in 1993 on 4AD/Warner Brothers, and in 1998 solely on 4AD. A remastered and repackaged CD edition of It'll End in Tears was issued with the complete This Mortal Coil recordings in a self-titled box set, released in late November 2011. The CD was released individually shortly thereafter.

In 2018, Pitchfork ranked It'll End in Tears at number eight on its list of "The 30 Best Dream Pop Albums".

Track listing

Personnel
Elizabeth Fraser – vocals
Robin Guthrie – guitar
Simon Raymonde – guitar, bass, synthesizer
Lisa Gerrard – vocals
Brendan Perry – bass drone, yangqin
John Fryer – multi-instruments, production
Cindy Sharp – vocals
Robbie Grey – vocals
Martyn Young – synthesizer, bass, guitar
Mark Cox – synthesizer
Steven Young – piano
Manuela Rickers – guitar
Martin McCarrick – cello
Gini Ball – violin, viola
Ivo Watts-Russell – keyboards, production
Howard Devoto – vocals

Charts

Singles
"Song to the Siren" – #66 UK Singles Chart (3 weeks), #3 UK Indie Chart (101 weeks), #8 NZ (15 weeks), #39 NL (4 weeks); released September 1983. "Song to the Siren"'s 101 weeks on the UK Indie Chart was the 4th longest chart run.
"Kangaroo" – #2 UK Indie Chart (20 weeks); released August 1984.

References

1984 debut albums
4AD albums
Albums produced by John Fryer (producer)
This Mortal Coil albums
Albums produced by Ivo Watts-Russell